Fectio, known as Vechten in Old Dutch, was a Roman castellum in the province Germania Inferior established in the year 4 or 5 AD. It was located at the place where the river Vecht (Fectio) branched off from the Rhine, leading to Lake Flevo, which was later to become the Zuiderzee. This was near the modern hamlet of Vechten in the municipality Bunnik, Utrecht, Netherlands.

History

Imperial Roman coinage teaches us that the castellum was built by order of Tiberius, then engaged in his campaign of 4–5 AD. It was probably used as a starting point for cross-border punitive raids. In 40 AD the emperor Caligula visited Fectio during the trip to Lugdunum Batavorum, the ancient Brittenburg. In its vineyards, the remains of an ancient postage stamp were discovered during the excavations of 1995.

Under the emperor Claudius, Fectio became part of the Rhine limes. Then around 70 AD, at the time of the Batava revolt, the castellum was completely burned. It was later rebuilt by a cavalry squadron. The accumulation of Rhine sediments began to change its path. Pottery from the XXII Primigenia legion has been discovered in "Castra Vetera", near present-day Xanten.

During the reign of Antoninus Pius, between 138 and 161 AD, the fortress was rebuilt, this time of brick and stone. Around 200 AD, it seems that the continuous sediments of the river prevented access to the boats. It was abandoned in 275 AD and was never rebuilt.

Data

Under emperor Claudius, Fectio became part of the Limes Germanicus. The archeological site contains the remains of a fort, port, cemetery, and a civilian settlement.

In 1995, it was submitted to be a World Heritage Site and is currently on the tentative list.

See also
 Germania Antiqua
 Flevum
 Waldgirmes Forum
 Roman camp, Marktbreit

References

External links

Fectio (Vechten) 
Roman 'Turris' at Fort Vechten

Roman legionary fortresses in Netherlands
Roman fortifications in Germania Inferior
Buildings and structures in Utrecht (province)
0s establishments in the Roman Empire
1st-century establishments
Bunnik